The Redonda anole (Anolis nubilis) is a species of anole lizard that is endemic to the small, uninhabited island of Redonda, part of Antigua and Barbuda in the Caribbean Lesser Antilles.

It is various shades of gray all over, occasionally with a yellowish tint around its eye.  Females have subtle striping on their back near their hindlimbs, and a stripe on each flank.  As Redonda is almost entirely treeless, the Redonda Anole spends most of its time on the ground and seeks shade under large rocks.

References

.

External links
Anolis nubilis at the Encyclopedia of Life
Anolis nubilis at the Reptile Database

Anoles
Lizards of the Caribbean
Endemic fauna of Antigua and Barbuda
Reptiles of Antigua and Barbuda
Reptiles described in 1887
Taxa named by Samuel Garman
Redonda